Kompromat is a 2022 French drama film directed by Jérôme Salle and written by Salle and Caryl Ferey.

Plot
Mathieu Roussel, director of the Alliance française in Irkutsk, works to promote the French language and francophone culture in the area. Roussel is unexpectedly forcefully removed from his home and charged by the FSB with dissemination of child pornography on the Internet and molesting his own daughter. He is remanded into custody pending further investigation under Article 242 of the Criminal Code of Russia. Elements intended to discredit Roussel's reputation by portraying him as a sexual deviant are gathered together as kompromat, such as child pornography planted on his computer and a dance performance he presented that contained a passionate dance between two men. The other prisoners learn of the charges and beat him mercilessly.

Roussel's lawyer facilitates Roussel's relocation to house arrest under surveillance. Roussel obtains prohibited SIM cards from Svetlana, a woman who believes in his innocence and hates her father-in-law Rostov, head of the FSB. These enable him to send text messages to her and to use the Internet without detection. Roussel's lawyer recognizes that Roussel will be convicted and sentenced to 10 to 15 years, so he advises Roussel to escape. Roussel covers his ankle bracelet with aluminum foil to stop it from tracking and heads to the bus station. When the FSB notices that his ankle bracelet is not transmitting, Svetlana gives her husband the telephone number of the SIM card she gave to Roussel, which he passes on to the FSB. The FSB traces the number to a phone that has been left on the bus to Ulaanbaatar. Meanwhile, Svetlana has picked Roussel up in her car and taken him to another contact, who takes him to a secret apartment.

Former Spetsnaz Sagarine is called in to find the fugitive. He immediately suspects Svetlana of assisting him but is unable to find any evidence. Roussel's photo is shown on TV and his neighbors report him, so he flees and escapes into Moscow with the help of a priest who claims to be the bishop of the patriarch of Moscow in order to stop a search and prevent Roussel from being found in the trunk of his car. Roussel reaches the French Embassy but the FSB quickly determines his location. Roussel attempts to escape amid a loud celebration being held at the embassy but is spotted by Sagarine. He manages to escape with the help of Svetlana, who drives him to the Estonian border. They have sex and Roussel tries to convince her to come with him but she says that she still loves her husband and will remain in Russia. He promises that he will call her but she says that she will not answer, then he starts walking toward the border. Svetlana's husband Sasha hangs himself after being scolded by his father for her actions. Svetlana calls home but is told by her father-in-law that she does not need to remain in Russia anymore. Sagarine spots Roussel's flashlight and he and his men chase Roussel through the woods. Sagarine finds Roussel in a marsh and nearly drowns him but Roussel overpowers Sagarine and drowns him instead, then flees across the border to Estonia. Svetlana reads in the news that Roussel has returned to France, but when he calls she does not answer the phone.

Cast 

 Gilles Lellouche as Mathieu Roussel
 Joanna Kulig as Svetlana
 Louis-Do de Lencquesaing as the French Ambassador
 Mikhail Gorevoy as Dimitri Rostov
 Aleksey Gorbunov as Borodin
 Elisa Lasowski as Alice Roussel
 Danila Vorobyov as Sasha Rostov
 Judith Henry as Michèle
 Igor Jijikine as Sagarine
 Pierre Hancisse as Juliene
 Mikhail Safronov as Ivanovich
 Marius Repsys as Shakir
 Olivia Malahieude as Rose Russell
 Sasha Piltsin as Sergey
 Marius Cizauskas as Stanislas
 Tanel Jonas as Vladimir
 Larisa Kalpokaite as Julia
 Algirdas Latenas as Boris
 Vidas Petkevicius as The Priest
 Arturas Lepiochinas as Mikhail
 Edmundas Kartanas as Sagarine's Chauffeur
 Vaidotas Zapolskis as Prison Guard
 Zydrunas Milasevicius as Prison Guard
 Arturas Kavaliauskas as Prison Guard
 Cecile Geindre as DGSE Agent
 Gaulthier Baillot as DGSE Agent
 Olivier Hélie as Fred
 Aleksandras Kleinas as Customs Officer
 Vaidotas Martinaitis as Juge
 Algimantas Maceina as Yuri
 Matias Boucard as Gendarme
 Edvardas Bogusevicius as Grandfather
 Povilas Jatkevicius as Young Man
 Clotilde Solange Rigaud as Receptionist
 Ausra Giedraityte as Ivanovich's Assistant

Production 
The film was planned to be a film about the actual kompromat case involving Yoann Barbereau. The production was unable to obtain rights to Barbereau's story, so a fictional story loosely based on the Barbereau case was created. Some similarities remain, for instance Barbereau was likewise the director of the Alliance française in Irkutsk and was likewise charged with disseminating child pornography and abusing his own daughter, only to escape from prison.

In an interview, Jérôme Salle stated, "We shot in Lithuania because, given the subject, it was very risky to shoot in Russia. In any case, we did not want to take the risk. It was difficult filming during a period of time greatly affected by covid, which we have all experienced as being extremely restrictive. We lived like hermit monks. When we finished the day, we returned to the hotel without being able to meet to discuss things, have a drink, or share a meal. Gilles Lellouche, who loves people and parties, found it quite an ordeal, but in the end, I think it served his character and the film. He found himself far from his family, far from his friends, from his bearings, completely isolated: like Mathieu in the story."

Release 
The film premiered at Alliance Française French Film Festival in March 2022. It was released in France on 7 September 2022.

Reception 
Reviewer Kyle Smith of The Wall Street Journal wrote, "The power of the film lies in how it crafts excitement out of a granular understanding of Russian state brutishness and the degree of determination it will require to evade it. It will take a spy’s level of resourcefulness to emerge from the labyrinth, and 'Kompromat' has the punch of a first-rate spy thriller."

Reviewer Michael Nordine of Variety called the film "cold but competent, which, whether intentional or not, is ultimately apropos of the subject matter."

References

External links 
 

2020s French films
2022 films
2022 drama films
Films about corruption
Films about miscarriage of justice
Films about prison escapes
Films directed by Jérôme Salle
Films set in Siberia
Films shot in Lithuania
French-language films
French drama films